Cork City was a parliamentary constituency in Ireland, represented in the Parliament of the United Kingdom. From 1880 to 1922 it returned two members of parliament (MPs) to the House of Commons of the United Kingdom of Great Britain and Ireland. From 1922 it was not represented in the UK Parliament, as it was no longer in the UK.

Cork City was the only constituency in Ireland to return the same number of members in each general election from the Act of Union in 1801 until the establishment of the Irish Free State in 1922.

Boundaries
This constituency comprised the whole of the County of the City of Cork, which was part of County Cork. Cork had the status of a county of itself, although it remained connected with County Cork for certain purposes.

The definition of the constituency boundary, from the Parliamentary Boundaries (Ireland) Act 1832 (c. 89 2& 3 Will. 4), was as follows.

A Topographical Directory of Ireland, published in 1837, describes the area covered.

The Directory also has a passage on the representative history. Other, more modern, sources ascribe an earlier date to the start of the parliamentary representation of Cork; but the passage is useful for information about the 19th century position.

The County of the City of Cork corresponds to the current barony of Cork.

Members of Parliament

Elections
Candidates referred to as Non Partisan, did not have a party allegiance specified in either Stooks Smith or Walker (see reference section below for the sources) or capable of being inferred by disaggregating different groups incorporated under one label by Walker (such as Whigs before 1859 being listed as Liberals).

In multi-member elections, a change in vote percentage is only calculated for individual candidates not for parties. No attempt is made to compare changes between single member by-elections and previous or subsequent multi-member elections.

Turnouts, in multi-member elections from 1832, are calculated on the basis of the number of electors Stooks Smith records as voting. In some cases estimated turnouts are obtained by dividing the ballots cast by two, to obtain the lowest possible turnout figure. To the extent that electors did not use both their votes, the estimate will be less than the actual turnout.

Elections of the 1910s 
 The constituency ceased to be represented in the United Kingdom Parliament, upon the dissolution of the House of Commons, in 1922. This was a few days before the Irish Free State came into existence.

 The count took place on 28 December 1918, to allow time for postal votes from the armed forces to arrive. The Sinn Féin MPs did not take their seats at Westminster.

 Redmond and Roche were associated with the United Irish League wing of Irish Nationalism.
 William O'Brien resigned again for a fourth time in January 1914 and re-stood to test local support for his policies, after the All-for-Ireland League suffered heavy defeats in the Cork City municipal elections.

 Roche and Murphy were associated with the United Irish League wing of Irish Nationalism.

Elections of the 1900s 
 Cosbie was associated with the United Irish League wing of Irish Nationalism

 William O'Brien resigned for a third time in 1909.

 William O'Brien was elected "without his knowledge and against his consent".
 Death of J. F. X. O'Brien, in 1905.

 William O'Brien resigned again in January 1904.

 The Irish National Federation, the Irish National League and William O'Brien's United Irish League joined forces, to re-create the Irish Parliamentary Party (IPP), in 1900. Healy contested the 1900 general election as an Independent Nationalist, after forming a Healyite faction, outside the IPP.

Elections of the 1890s 

 Resignation of William O'Brien

 The Irish Parliamentary Party split in December 1890. Parnell led the Irish National League, Parnellite Nationalist group. Most of the IPP MPs (including Healy) set up the Irish National Federation as the Anti-Parnellite Nationalist organisation.
 Parnell died in office.

Elections of the 1880s 

 

 Caused by Daly's resignation.
 1882: Home Rule League/Nationalist Party becomes the Irish Parliamentary Party

Elections of the 1870s 

 Death of Ronayne, on 7 May 1876

 

 Death of Maguire (founder Cork Examiner), on 1 November 1872

Elections of the 1860s 

 

 Resignation of Lyons

Elections of the 1850s 

 Death of Fagan

 

 Appointment of Murphy as a Commissioner of Insolvency

 

 Resignation of Fagan

Elections of the 1840s 

 Death of Callaghan

 

 Resignation of Murphy by accepting the office of Steward of the Manor of Northstead

Elections of the 1830s 

 Note: On petition Leycester and Chatterton were unseated and Callaghan and Baldwin were declared duly elected, on 18 April 1835.

 Caused by Callaghan's election in 1829 being declared void. 
 Note: Daniel Callaghan was the brother of Gerrard Callaghan. Stooks Smith classifies Callaghan as a Repealer from this election, but this may not be an accurate description for the period before 1832. See the footnote to the above table of MPs for a brief description of Callaghan's political views.

Elections of the 1820s 
 Election of Callaghan declared void, on petition

 Death of Colthurst

 Death of Hely-Hutchinson

Elections of the 1810s

Elections of the 1800s 

 Hon. John Hely-Hutchinson created the 1st Baron Hutchinson

 1801, 1 January Irish House of Commons members nominated to sit in the corresponding House of Parliament at Westminster

Notes

References
The Parliaments of England by Henry Stooks Smith (1st edition published in three volumes 1844–50), 2nd edition edited (in one volume) by F.W.S. Craig (Political Reference Publications 1973)
, Cork History and Society Patrick O'Flanagan/ Cornelius G. Buttimer Geography Publications 1993

External links
Part of the Library Ireland: Irish History and Culture website containing the text of A Topographical Directory of Ireland, by Samuel Lewis (a work published by S. Lewis & Co of London in 1837) including an article on City of Cork

Westminster constituencies in County Cork (historic)
Dáil constituencies in the Republic of Ireland (historic)
Constituencies of the Parliament of the United Kingdom established in 1801
Constituencies of the Parliament of the United Kingdom disestablished in 1922
Politics of Cork (city)